Five referendums were held in Switzerland during 1920. The first three were held on 21 March on a federal law on regulating employment contracts, a ban on creating gambling establishments and a counterproposal to the ban. The fourth was held on 16 May on membership the League of Nations (which Switzerland had become a founding member of the previous year), whilst the fifth was held on 31 October on a federal law on working times on railways and other transport services. Of the five, only the ban on gambling establishments, League of Nations membership and the law on working times were passed.

Background
The referendum on joining the League of Nations was a mandatory referendum, whilst the ban on gambling establishments was a popular initiative. Together with the counter-proposal, all three required a double majority; a majority of the popular vote and majority of the cantons. The decision of each canton was based on the vote in that canton. Full cantons counted as one vote, whilst half cantons counted as half. The referendums on employment contracts and working times were optional referendums, which required only a majority of the public vote.

According to a contemporary analysis, support and opposition for joining the League of Nations were organized along the following lines:Acceptance of membership in the league was strongly favored by the powerful Independent Democratic (Radical) party, the Liberal Democratic (Protestant Conservative) party, the recently formed anti-bolshevist Peasants' party, the Christian Social party, and the Griitlianer. The Catholic Conservatives were divided, some of their most eminent leaders, both lay and clerical, being found in opposing camps. The Socialists who have accepted bolshevism leadership fought the league with all their accustomed arguments and bitterness. Curiously enough, the same attitude was taken by a group of the higher officers of the Swiss army, led by Ulrich Wille, the former general in chief. Party lines were more or less cut across, however, by racial, linguistic, religious and personal prejudices.

Results

Federal law on regulating employment contracts

Ban on creating gambling establishments

Counterproposal on gambling establishments

League of Nations membership

Federal law on working time

References

1920 referendums
1920 in Switzerland
Referendums in Switzerland